NGC 4237 is a flocculent spiral galaxy located about 60 million light-years away in the constellation Coma Berenices. The galaxy was discovered by astronomer William Herschel on December 30, 1783 and is a member of the Virgo Cluster. It is also classified as a LINER galaxy and as a Seyfert galaxy.

NGC 4237 appears to be deficient in neutral atomic hydrogen (H I). This, combined with its large projected distance from M87 and its radial velocity close to the Virgo Cluster mean suggests that the galaxy may be on a highly radial orbit through the center of the cluster.

Gallery

See also
 List of NGC objects (4001–5000)
 NGC 4212

References

External links

4237
39393
Coma Berenices
Virgo Cluster
Astronomical objects discovered in 1783
Flocculent spiral galaxies
7315
Seyfert galaxies
LINER galaxies